Black Harvest is a 1993 Danish drama film directed by Anders Refn. The film was selected as the Danish entry for the Best Foreign Language Film at the 66th Academy Awards, but was not accepted as a nominee.

Cast
 Ole Ernst as Nils Uldahl-Ege
 Sofie Gråbøl as Clara Uldahl-Ege
 Marika Lagercrantz as Line Uldahl-Ege
 Philip Zandén as Isidor Seemann
 Cecilie Brask as Frederikke Uldahl-Ege
 Mette Maria Ahrenkiel as Charlotte Uldahl-Ege
 Anna Eklund as Anna Uldahl-Ege

See also
 List of submissions to the 66th Academy Awards for Best Foreign Language Film
 List of Danish submissions for the Academy Award for Best Foreign Language Film

References

External links
 

1993 films
1993 drama films
Danish drama films
1990s Danish-language films
Films directed by Anders Refn